DH1 may refer to:
 DH-1 (rocket), a proposed two-stage rocket design
 Airco DH.1, a British First World War biplane
 EMD DH1, an experimental switching locomotive
 Häfeli DH-1, a Swiss reconnaissance aircraft built 1916
 Rhodesia Railways class DH1, a class of diesel locomotive